Blat or BLAT may refer to:

 BLAT (bioinformatics), an algorithm
 Blat (favors), a form of corruption in Russia and the Soviet Union
 Blat (Romania), a term denoting a fixed match in Romanian football
 Blat (software) is a Windows command line utility that sends email using SMTP or posts to Usenet using NNTP.
 Blat, Byblos District, a village in Mount Lebanon Governorate, Lebanon
 Blat, Marjayoun a village in Marjeyoun District, Lebanon
 Caio Blat (born 1980), Brazilian actor

See also 
 Blatt
 Der Blatt, a weekly Yiddish newspaper published in New York
 Ballat, a village in Homs Governorate, Syria